Dou Aixia (born 10 August 1961) is a Chinese cross-country skier. She competed in three events at the 1984 Winter Olympics.

References

External links
 

1961 births
Living people
Chinese female cross-country skiers
Olympic cross-country skiers of China
Cross-country skiers at the 1984 Winter Olympics
Skiers from Jilin